Smithsonidrilus is a genus of oligochaete worms.

Species 
The following species are currently recognized within Smithsonidrilus:

 Smithsonidrilus appositus Erséus, 1990
 Smithsonidrilus arcuatus Erséus, 1997
 Smithsonidrilus arduus Erséus, 1997
 Smithsonidrilus assimilis (Erséus, 1990) 
 Smithsonidrilus capricornae (Erséus, 1983) 
 Smithsonidrilus convexus Erséus, 1997
 Smithsonidrilus edgari Erséus, 1993
 Smithsonidrilus exspectatus Erséus, 1993
 Smithsonidrilus fecundus Erséus & Wang, 2005
 Smithsonidrilus grandiculus (Erséus, 1983) 
 Smithsonidrilus hummelincki (Righi & Kanner, 1979) 
 Smithsonidrilus involutus Erséus, 1990
 Smithsonidrilus irregularis (Erséus, 1983) 
 Smithsonidrilus ludmillae Erséus, 1997
 Smithsonidrilus luteolus (Erséus, 1983) 
 Smithsonidrilus marinus Brinkhurst, 1966
 Smithsonidrilus minusculus (Erséus, 1983) 
 Smithsonidrilus multiglandularis Erséus, 1990
 Smithsonidrilus nimius Erséus, 1997
 Smithsonidrilus pauper Erséus, 1990
 Smithsonidrilus peruanus  (Finogenova, 1986) 
 Smithsonidrilus sacculatus (Erséus, 1983) 
 Smithsonidrilus tenuiculus (Erséus, 1984) 
 Smithsonidrilus tuber (Erséus, 1983) 
 Smithsonidrilus vesiculatus (Erséus, 1984) 
 Smithsonidrilus westoni Erséus, 1982

References

Further reading 
 Diaz, Robert J., and Christer Erseus. "Habitat preferences and species associations of shallow-water marine Tubificidae (Oligochaeta) from the barrier reef ecosystems off Belize, Central America." Aquatic Oligochaete Biology V. Springer Netherlands, 1994. 93-105.
 Erséus, Christer. "Mangroves and marine oligochaete diversity." Wetlands Ecology and Management 10.3 (2002): 197–202.

Animals described in 1966
Invertebrates of Central America
Tubificina
Annelid genera